The Understudy: Graveyard Shift II is a 1988 Canadian direct-to-video horror film directed by Jerry Ciccoritti and starring Michael A. Miranda and Wendy Gazelle. It is the sequel to Graveyard Shift (1987).

Premise
The macho Italian vampire Baisez appears on the set of a low-budget film about vampirism and billiards and seduces the cast and crew.

Cast
Michael A. Miranda as Baisze (as Silvio Oliviero)
Wendy Gazelle as Camilla/Patti
Mark Soper as Matthew
Ilse von Glatz as Ash
Tim Kelleher as Duke/Larry
Leslie Kelly as Martina (as Leslie Kelly)
Paul Amato as Alan
Carl Alacchi as Ramoan/Apache

Production notes
The film was shot in Toronto, Ontario.

External links

1988 films
1988 horror films
Direct-to-video horror films
Films shot in Toronto
Canadian independent films
English-language Canadian films
Canadian vampire films
Direct-to-video sequel films
Cue sports films
Films directed by Jerry Ciccoritti
1980s English-language films
1980s Canadian films